The Pac-12 Conference Men's Soccer Freshman of the Year award is an annual award given to the top freshman soccer player in the Pac-12 Conference. The award was first given out in 2000.

Key

Winners

Freshman of the Year (2000–present)

References 

College soccer trophies and awards in the United States
Freshman of the Year
Awards established in 2000
College sports freshman awards
Pac-12